Nelson Bonifacio Acosta López, nicknamed Pelado Acosta (Bald Acosta), (born 12 June 1944 in Paso de los Toros, Uruguay) is a former Uruguayan-born Chilean football manager and footballer. He became a naturalized Chilean citizen in 1984 and managed several football teams. He is now retired.

Career
He managed the national team of Chile from 1996 to 2001, leading them to the 1998 FIFA World Cup despite having only managed one professional team before taking over the Chile job. He took over Bolivia in 2004, but seriously failed and returned to manage Chile in 2005. In July 2007 Acosta resigned from managing the Chile national team soon after the Copa América, the latter was held in Venezuela.

In September 2007, he was appointed manager of Corporación Deportiva Everton de Viña del Mar, one of the top provincial teams in Chile. On June 3, 2008, he led Everton to their first Chilean League title in 32 years and ended the domestic dominance of Colo-Colo.

In late 2010, he switched to manage Cobreloa, but was sacked in April 2012. He returned to Everton de Viña del Mar in January 2014 but left nearly 9 months later to manage current club Deportivo Quito.

Personal life
Acosta naturalized Chilean by residence.

Before beginning his career as coach, he owned a boutique in Concepción what he managed while he played for Lota Schwager.

Since 2016, he suffers the Alzheimer's disease.

Honours

Player

Club
Peñarol
 Primera División (3): 1973, 1974, 1975

Managerial

Club
Unión Española
 Copa Chile (2): 1992, 1993

Cobreloa
 Primera División de Chile (2): 2003–A, 2004–C

Everton
 Primera División de Chile (1): 2008–A

International
Chile
 Summer Olympics Tournament Bronze Medal (1): 2000

References

1944 births
Living people
People from Paso de los Toros
Uruguayan footballers
Huracán Buceo players
Peñarol players
Everton de Viña del Mar footballers
O'Higgins F.C. footballers
C.D. Arturo Fernández Vial footballers
Lota Schwager footballers
Uruguayan Primera División players
Chilean Primera División players
Uruguayan expatriate sportspeople in Chile
Expatriate footballers in Chile
Association football midfielders
Uruguayan football managers
Uruguayan emigrants to Chile
Naturalized citizens of Chile
Chilean football managers
Arturo Fernández Vial managers
O'Higgins F.C. managers
Unión Española managers
Cruz Azul managers
Chile national football team managers
Cobreloa managers
Bolivia national football team managers
Everton de Viña del Mar managers
S.D. Quito managers
Deportes Iquique managers
Chilean Primera División managers
Primera B de Chile managers
Liga MX managers
Uruguayan expatriate football managers
Chilean expatriate football managers
Chilean expatriate sportspeople in Mexico
Uruguayan expatriate sportspeople in Mexico
Chilean expatriate sportspeople in Bolivia
Uruguayan expatriate sportspeople in Bolivia
Chilean expatriate sportspeople in Ecuador
Uruguayan expatriate sportspeople in Ecuador
Expatriate football managers in Mexico
Expatriate football managers in Bolivia
Expatriate football managers in Ecuador
1998 FIFA World Cup managers
1997 Copa América managers
1999 Copa América managers
2007 Copa América managers